Caroline Gaudriault (born in Paris) is a French author. She has also created art installations for museums based on her literary texts. Over the last 20 years she has worked closely with French photographer Gérard Rancinan.

Biography 

As an independent journalist, Gaudriault contributes to international publications including Paris-Match, The Sunday Times Magazine, Stern and Time, and runs her blog, The Zig-Zag, which was launched in 2013.

Work 
Her philosophical texts and essays are inspiration for Rancinan's photographs. Her editorial works and his photographs are influencing each other reciprocally. They work as an artistic couple and exhibit their works, including photographs, texts, and books, together. Generally Gaudriault curates the exhibitions and is in charge of the editorial outlines. She has created calligraphy installations to give form to her texts; these installations became part of the group exhibitions with Rancinan.

One early collaboration project with Rancinan was her historical review of the people who survived the bombing of Hiroshima in 1945. The project Paroles d'hibakusha presents the survivors, the so called hibakusha, and gives them the possibility to express themselves. Gaudriault conducted interviews with survivors in order to present their individual histories.

A crucial project in her work is the book A Small Man in a Big World, which she published in 2014, and was later translated in English and Chinese. She conducted an interview with American political scientist and senior fellow professor at Stanford University, Francis Fukuyama. Their thoughts about political systems, relationship with modernity, cultural heritage, and social contradictions became central points of the interview.

Books 

 Urban Jungle, Edition de La Martinière, 1999
 Rancinan Exploit, Edition Federico Motta, Milan, 2004
 Le Temps des rencontres, By Us, 2007
 The Photographer, Edition Abrams, New York, 2008
 Métamorphoses, conversations & natures mortes, Trilogy of the Moderns Part I, Biro & Cohen éditeurs, 2009
 Hypothèses, Trilogy of the Moderns Part II, Edition Paradox, 2011
 Wonderful World, Trilogy of the Moderns Part III, Editions Paradox, 2012
 A Small Man in a Big World, Editions Paradox, 2014 - conversation with Francis Fukuyama
 Another day on Earth, Paradox, 2015
 A democratic murder, Paradox édition, 2019 
 Soulages, les reflets, Paradox édition, (on the painter Pierre Soulages), 2019
 Voyage Immoblile, Paradox, 2021

Art Exhibitions 

 Villa Tamaris, La Seyne sur Mer, France, "Voyage en démocratie!" 2022
 Mohammed VI Museum of Modern and Contemporary Art, Rabbat, Maroco, «From rage and desire, the human heart beating» 2022
 Foundation Dassault, Paris, France “The motionless journey”, 2021
 Castle St Maur cru classé, domaine de Saint-Tropez, France, 2020
 Danubiana Meulensteen Art Museum, Bratislava, Slovaquie, "DEMOCRATIA", 2019
 Institut Bernard Magrez, Bordeaux, France, "Festins", 2019
 Musée de la Mer, Bordeaux, France, exhibition "Raft of Illusions", 2019
 See + Gallery, Pékin, Chine, « Small Man », 2018
 Chapelle Sainte Anne, La Baule, France, « The Moderns », 2017
 Collégiale Saint-André, Chartres, France, « Destiny of men », 2017
 La Base sous-marine de Bordeaux, France, « The Probability of Miracle », 2016
 Centre d’art Urban Spree, Berlin, Allemagne, «Destiny of men», 2016
 Jardin Rouge de la Fondation Montresso de Marrakech, Maroc, 2016
 L’Académie des Beaux-Arts de Florence, Italie, « Destiny of men», 2016
 Palais des Beaux-Arts de Lille, France, collective exhibition « Joie de vivre », 2016 Commissaire d’exposition : Bruno Girveau 
 Couvent des Cordeliers de Paris, France, « Destiny of men», 2015 Curator : Paul Ardenne 
 National Portrait Gallery, Londres, Grande-Bretagne, permanent collection « Barry McGuigan », 2015
 Musée Océanographique de Monaco, France, « An other day on earth », 2015
 Musée d’art contemporain Himalayas de Shanghai, Chine, « The Trilogy of the Moderns », 2014
 Centre d’art Sinan Mansions, Shanghai, Chine, « A Small Man in a Big World », 2014
 Musée du Louvre Lens, Lens, France, « Liberty unveiled », 2013-2018
 Quai d’Orsay, Ministère des Affaires Étrangères, Paris, France, «Batman Family », 2013-2015
 Fondation Pinault et la ville de Dinard, France, collective exhibition « Festin de l’Art », 2014 Commissaire d’exposition : Jean-Jacques Aillagon
 Museo Oscar Niemeyer, Curitiba, Brésil, « A Wonderful World », 2014
 Musée d'Art Contemporain (MAC), Lyon, France, collective exhibition « Moto Poétique », 2014 Curator : Paul Ardenne 
 Musée des Arts et Métiers, Paris, France, « Fiest of Barbarians », 2013 
 Musée d'Art Contemporain Danubiana, Bratislava, Slovaquie, « Trilogy of the Moderns», 2013 Curator : Vincent Polakovic
 Musée d’Art Contemporain - Les Abattoirs, Toulouse, France, exposition collective «L’Histoire est à moi ! », 2012 Curator : Paul Ardenne
 Londonewcastle Project Space, Shoreditch, Londres, Grande-Bretagne, « Wonderful World», 2012 Curator : Ed Bartlett
 Triennale di Milano, Milan, Italie, « Trilogy of the Moderns », 2012 Curator : Claudio De Albertis
 Gemeentemuseum Den Haag, LaHaye, Pays-Bas, collective exhibition « Reflex Miniature Museum », 2011 
 Chapelle Saint-Sauveur, Paris/Issy les Moulineaux, France, « Hypothèses », 2011
 Musée des Arts Décoratifs de Prague, Prague, République Tchèque, collective exhibition «Decadence Now », 2010
 Palais de Tokyo, Paris, France, "Métamorphoses", 2009 Curator : Marc-Olivier Wahler
 Palais de Tokyo, Paris, France, "Le Photographe", 2008 Mécène : Baume&Mercier

Films 

 The Trip, a short film by Gérard Rancinan and  Caroline Gaudriault, 8 minutes, 2020
 The Immortals, a film by Gérard Rancinan and  Caroline Gaudriault, 35 minutes, 2019
 The probability of Miracle, a film by Gérard Rancinan and Caroline Gaudriault, 48 minutes, 2015

External links 

 Official website

References

Living people
French journalists
Year of birth missing (living people)